Franco Agentho (born 2 August 1973) is a Ugandan boxer. He competed in the 1996 Summer Olympics.

References

1973 births
Living people
Boxers at the 1996 Summer Olympics
Ugandan male boxers
Olympic boxers of Uganda
Lightweight boxers